Wingate is a mixed residential and industrial neighbourhood of Lower Hutt, in the Wellington Region of New Zealand's North Island. Served by Wingate Railway Station, the area comprises parts of the suburbs of Taitā, Avalon and Naenae. The area is home to many of Lower Hutt's manufacturing and export-oriented businesses.

The area was named after the British general, Orde Wingate, who was killed in an air crash in Burma in 1944. Wingate Railway Station was opened in 1950.

References

Suburbs of Lower Hutt